Project JEDI is an open source project created in 1997, which started with the goal to translate C header files to Object Pascal and share the results with fellow Delphi programmers. The name decided on was Project JEDI (the "Joint Endeavour of Delphi Innovators"). Over time it evolved to include other aspects of Delphi programming: runtime library (RTL) enhancements, new visual components for the VCL and version control.  Today, as a stable code collection, it is one of the largest open source Delphi libraries, and its code is widely used in the Delphi community.

Objectives 

Project JEDI has set itself the task of converting published C header files into new Delphi units, classes and components that make new technologies freely available for use in the native Delphi environment. The original goals were:

 to provide Delphi developers with timely access to Application Programming Interfaces(APIs), libraries and other facilities which extend the capability of the Delphi programming environment
 to produce consistent, well-tested and fully documented products for the benefit of all Delphi users
 to make everything produced by Project JEDI freely available, with source, to anyone wishing to use it

Nowadays, the future of Project JEDI is "up to the members" according to the Project JEDI director. The overall project JEDI structure is now stable and subprojects can drive their own development. Most subprojects are actively developed and they can be used with the latest versions of Delphi and C++Builder.

Subprojects 

Project JEDI is split in different subprojects, each dedicated to specific tasks:
 JEDI Darth (JDARTH): formerly known as HeadConv, an automated tool to convert C header files to Delphi;
 JEDI Windows API Library (JWAL): an almost complete translation of Windows SDK header files to Pascal.
 JEDI Code Library (JCL): major RTL  enhancements.
 JEDI Visual Component Library (JVCL): the most-known subproject, more than 600 visual components.
 JEDI Version Control System (JVCS): a version control system completely written in Delphi.
 JEDI QuickTime: a translation of QuickTime header files to Pascal and QuickTime-related components and code.

References

External links
 Project JEDI Website
 Official JEDI Wikipage
 Project JEDI presentation and call for contribution to the Delphi community
 JEDI QuickTime (moved to https://github.com/zoomicon/jedi-quicktime)

Free software projects
Delphi (programming language)
Pascal (programming language) software